Hoffman-Kensington High School was located in Hoffman, Minnesota and included the towns of Hoffman and Kensington.  The two towns joined schools due to declining enrollment in 1979.  Their mascot was the Patriot and their colors were red and blue.  In 1980, H-K won the Minnesota State 9-Man Football Championship on their home field.  The school disbanded in 1993 and joined the towns of Barrett, Elbow Lake, and Wendell to form the West Central Area school district.

Educational institutions established in 1979
Educational institutions disestablished in 1993
Education in Grant County, Minnesota
Education in Douglas County, Minnesota
Defunct schools in Minnesota
1979 establishments in Minnesota
1993 disestablishments in Minnesota